Le Bal is a 1931 French comedy drama film directed by Wilhelm Thiele, and written by Curt Siodmak, Ladislas Fodor and  (dialogue). A German-language version, was simultaneously filmed with a different cast.

Cast
Germaine Dermoz as  Madame Kampf 
Danielle Darrieux as  Antoinette 
André Lefaur as  M. Kampf 
Pierre de Guingand as Marcel de Brécourt 
Marguerite Pierry as  La cousine Henriette 
Allan Durant  
Vanda Gréville as Miss Betty 
Paulette Dubost as La cliente

References

External links

Le Bal (1931 film) at Allmovie

1931 films
1931 comedy-drama films
1931 multilingual films
French black-and-white films
French comedy-drama films
French multilingual films
Films based on French novels
Films with screenplays by Curt Siodmak
1930s French-language films
1930s French films